The 2017–18 Miami hurricanes women's basketball team represented the University of Miami during the 2017–18 NCAA Division I women's basketball season. The Hurricanes, led by thirteenth-year head coach Katie Meier, play their home games at the Watsco Center and were members of the Atlantic Coast Conference. They finished the season 21–11, 10–6 in ACC play to finish in a 3-way tie for sixth place. They advanced to the quarterfinals of the ACC women's tournament where they lost to Florida State. They received an at-large bid of the NCAA women's tournament where they lost in the rematch of last year's second round to Quinnipiac in the first round.

Roster

Schedule

|-
!colspan=9 style="background:#005030; color:#F47321;"| Exhibition

|-
!colspan=9 style="background:#005030; color:#F47321;"| Non-conference regular season

|-
!colspan=9 style="background:#005030; color:#F47321;"| ACC regular season

|-
!colspan=9 style="background:#005030; color:#F47321;"| ACC Women's Tournament

|-
!colspan=9 style="background:#005030; color:#F47321;"| NCAA Women's Tournament

Source

Rankings

References

Miami Hurricanes women's basketball seasons
Miami
Miami